Fred Crespo is a Democratic member of the Illinois House of Representatives, representing the 44th district since 2007.  This district lies entirely within Cook County and includes all of Streamwood, approximately half of Hoffman Estates and Hanover Park, and portions of Schaumburg, Elgin, and Bartlett.

Early life, education and career
Crespo attended Loyola University, Chicago.

Illinois General Assembly
Crespo has been a member of the following Legislative Committees:
Appropriations for General Services, Chair
Education Policy, Chair
Elementary and Secondary Education, Vice Chair
Mass Transit, Member
Public Utilities, Member
Small Business Empowerment and Workforce Development, Member
Subcommittee on Mandates, Member
Tourism and Conventions, Member

Achievements
Crespo provided assistance for the construction of the much-needed Alexian Brothers Women's and Children's Hospital in the Northwest Suburbs of Chicago.

Crespo worked with the Village of Hoffman Estates to secure funding for a full interchange at Interstate 90 and Barrington Road which, when completed in 2016, will improve both economic opportunities for the area as well as life-safety conditions for the region.

Crespo worked collaboratively with the Village of Hanover Park, Harper Community College and Elgin Community College to open the Work and Education Center in Hanover Park in 2014.

In 2018, then-Governor-elect J.B. Pritzker appointed Crespo to the Educational Success transition committee, which is responsible for state education policy.

Electoral history

Awards and recognition
Crespo was recognized with the Illinois Office of Tourism Lincoln Award for his commitment to economic development in the State of Illinois.

Crespo has been recognized for his ongoing commitment and contributions to mental health concerns with the Legislator of the Year Award from the Illinois Psychological Association, the Illinois Hero Award from the National Association of Mental Illness (NAMI) and the Legislator of the Year Award from the National Association of Anorexia Nervosa and Associated Disorders (ANAD). Women In Need Growing Stronger (WINGS) recognized Crespo for his efforts to end domestic violence, including his strong support for Civil Order of Protection laws in the State.

Personal life
Crespo and his wife Dorothy have two children.

References

External links
Representative Fred Crespo (D) 44th District at the Illinois General Assembly
By session: 98th, 97th, 96th, 95th
 
Representative Fred Crespo constituency site
Rep. Fred Crespo at Illinois House Democrats

Members of the Illinois House of Representatives
Illinois Democrats
Illinois Republicans
Businesspeople from Illinois
Loyola University Chicago alumni
Living people
Year of birth missing (living people)
21st-century American politicians
People from Hoffman Estates, Illinois
Hispanic and Latino American state legislators in Illinois